Kuran-e Sofla (also Romanized as Kūrān-e Soflá and Kooran Soofla; also known as Kūrān-e Pā‘īn) is a village in Damen Rural District, in the Central District of Iranshahr County, Sistan and Baluchestan Province, Iran. At the 2006 census, its population was 1,384, in 216 families.

References 

Populated places in Iranshahr County